Jane Tavares de Oliveira (born 17 November 1993), known as Jane Tavares or just Jane, is a Brazilian footballer who plays as a forward for Santos.

Club career
Jane was born in Vassouras, Rio de Janeiro, and began her career with Vasco da Gama in 2013. She subsequently played for Botafogo in the following year, before joining Flamengo ahead of the 2015 season.

Jane left Flamengo in the end of 2018, and represented ,  and Atlético Mineiro during the 2019 campaign. On 20 January 2020, she moved to Grêmio.

Jane renewed with Grêmio for one further year on 15 January 2021, but left the club at the end of the season. On 3 February 2022, she was announced at Santos.

On 22 November 2022, Jane renewed her contract with Santos for a further season.

References

1993 births
Living people
Sportspeople from Rio de Janeiro (state)
Brazilian footballers
Brazilian women's footballers
Women's association football forwards
Campeonato Brasileiro de Futebol Feminino Série A1 players
CR Vasco da Gama (women) players
Clube de Regatas do Flamengo (women) players
Grêmio Foot-Ball Porto Alegrense (women) players
Santos FC (women) players
People from Vassouras